This article lists the squads for the 2016 SheBelieves Cup, the inaugural edition of the SheBelieves Cup. The cup consisted of a series of friendly games, and was held in the United States from 3 to 9 March 2016. The four national teams involved in the tournament registered a squad of 23 players.

The age listed for each player is on 3 March 2016, the first day of the tournament. The club listed is the club for which the player last played a competitive match prior to the tournament. The nationality for each club reflects the national association (not the league) to which the club is affiliated. A flag is included for coaches that are of a different nationality than their own national team.

Squads

England
Coach:  Mark Sampson

The final squad was announced on 22 February 2016.

France
Coach: Philippe Bergeroo

The final squad was announced on 23 February 2016. On 24 February 2016, Amandine Henry withdrew from the squad due to ongoing recovery from injury and was replaced by Viviane Asseyi. The next day, Laure Boulleau withdrew from the squad due to injury and was replaced by Sakina Karchaoui. A few days later, Karchaoui also withdrew due to injury and was replaced by Marion Torrent.

Germany
Coach: Silvia Neid

The final squad was announced on 16 February 2016. On 23 February 2016, Felicitas Rauch withdrew from the squad due to injury and was replaced by Kathrin Hendrich. On 26 February 2016, Melanie Leupolz withdrew from the squad due to a bone edema and was replaced by Svenja Huth.

United States
Coach: Jill Ellis

The final squad was announced on 26 February 2016.

Player representation

By club
Clubs with 3 or more players represented are listed.

By club nationality

By club federation

By representatives of domestic league

References

2016
2016 in American women's soccer
2016 in women's association football
2015–16 in English women's football
March 2016 sports events in the United States